Casandrino is a comune (municipality) in the Metropolitan City of Naples in the Italian region Campania, located about 11 km north of Naples.

Casandrino borders the following municipalities: Arzano, Grumo Nevano, Melito di Napoli, Naples, Sant'Antimo. Casandrino is the place of birth of many notable people, among all, the chemist and cosmetic expert Vincenzo Fabio Limongiello.

References

Cities and towns in Campania